Nicole M. Gerardo is an entomologist and Professor of Biology  at Emory University in Atlanta, Georgia. In 2021, she became editor of the Annual Review of Entomology.

Early life and education
Gerardo earned a B.A. in Ecology and Evolutionary Biology from Rice University in Houston, Texas in 1997. She received her Ph.D. in Integrative Biology from the University of Texas at Austin in Austin, Texas in 2004.

Career
Gerardo is an entomologist and Professor of Biology  at Emory University in Atlanta, Georgia.
Gerardo's work focuses on evolutionary ecology, in particular the relationships between both beneficial and harmful microbes and their hosts.  For example, aphids are supplied with nutrients by  beneficial bacteria and may have lowered immunity to ensure that the relationship continues. 
Her whole-genome analyses of insect species have revealed that the pea aphid appears to have lost the Imd pathway, considered a key immune pathway in many species.
Her work on the genetics of insect species has also revealed patterns of immune gene evolution of monarch butterflies.
Another of her areas of study involves fungal pathogens, fungus-growing ants and their gardens, which are regarded as a model of symbiosis.

Awards and honors
 2020, Emory Williams Distinguished Undergraduate Teaching Award, Emory University

References

Living people
American entomologists
Women entomologists
Rice University alumni
University of Texas at Austin alumni
American women botanists
American botanists
21st-century American biologists
Annual Reviews (publisher) editors
Year of birth missing (living people)
21st-century American women scientists